The 2018–19 season is the 63rd season in RK Zamet’s history. It is their 12th successive season in the Dukat Premier League, and 42nd successive top tier season.

Team

Current squad

Goalkeeper
 12  Marin Sorić
 30  Tino Viskić

Wingers
RW
 5   Martin Mozetić
 17   Sandro Samardžić

LW
7  Luka Grgurević
 10  Dario Jeličić (captain)
 22  Marko Mrakovčić

Line players
 4  Karlo Tadić
 72  Jan Koler
 90  Veron Načinović

Back players
LB
  Antionio Dizdar
 11  Vanja Šehić
 86  Matija Starčević

CB 
 4  Tony Zarev
 9  Nikola Njegovan
 13  Tin Tomljanović

RB
  Ivan Jurčević
 88  Patrik Martinović

Source: Rukometstat.com

Technical staff
  President: Vedran Devčić
  Sports director: Vedran Babić
  Head Coach: Valter Matošević
  Assistant coach: Sandro Gulja
  Fizioterapist: Dragan Marijanović
  Fitness coach: Milan Rončević
  Team Manager: Boris Konjuh

Competitions

Overall

Last updated: 6 October 2019

Paket 24 Premier League

League table

Updated to match(es) played on 6 October 2019. Source: Premijer liga Rezultati.com

Matches

Friendly matches

Pre-season  matches

Transfers

In

Out

Sources
Hrs.hr
Rk-zamet.hr
SportCom.hr
Sport.net.hr
Rezultati.com

References

RK Zamet seasons